Sasa Sjanic (born 18 February 1981) is a former Swedish footballer who played as a goalkeeper.

References

External links
 (archive)

Gefle IF players
1986 births
Living people
Association football goalkeepers
Allsvenskan players
Swedish footballers
Kalmar FF players
IFK Norrköping players
IK Sleipner players
Vasalunds IF players